Drillia corusca is a species of sea snail, a marine gastropod mollusk in the family Drilliidae.

Description
The shell has a rather pyramidal shape. It is highly polished. The upper portion of the whorls are flat, clouded with reddish brown and white. The lower portion are more prominent, encircled with a row of irregular reddish brown dots. The body whorl is encircled with two rows of dots. The aperture is short. The siphonal canal is very short.

The shell differs much from the ordinary type of Drillia, the form being more like a Daphnella.

Distribution
This marine species occurs off the Philippines.

References

 Reeve, Proc. Zool. Soc. London (1843) 
 Boettger, O. "Die marinen Mollusken der Philippinen (IV) nach den Sammlungen des Herrn JOSÉ FLORENCIO QUADRA in Manila. IV. Die Pleurotomiden." Nachrichtsblatt der Deutschen Malakozoologischen Gesellschaft 27 (1895): 41–63.

External links

corusca
Gastropods described in 1843